Neve Dan, also Shikun Dan, is a residential neighborhood of Tel Aviv, Israel. It is located in the northeastern part of the city. It is named after the tribe of Dan, whose first living place was here.

History
Neve Dan was founded as Yad HaMa'avir. Construction started in 1947 and completed in 1950. The neighborhood was built to house the employees of the Dan Bus Company.

In 1953 Yad HaMa'avir was incorporated into Tel Aviv. In 1957 the neighborhood's housing, previously owned by the Israeli government, was handed over to the residents.

References

Neighborhoods of Tel Aviv